The Circle City Conference or CCC is a high school athletic conference in the central district of the Indiana High School Athletic Association (IHSAA) consisting of 6 private schools; four Catholic schools and two nondenominational Christian schools in Greater Indianapolis. It began competition at the beginning of the 2016–2017 school year following a crackdown by the IHSAA on the multiple private schools that were playing multiple independent schedules outside of Indiana.  The first sporting event in the conference was a boy's varsity tennis match between Brebeuf Jesuit and Guerin Catholic that took place on August 18, 2016. The Golden Eagles defeated the Braves 4–1. , Greg VanSlambrook is the president of the conference. Combined, the six schools have accounted for 74 IHSAA state championships.

Membership

State championships

The Indiana High School Athletic Association has awarded the schools the following state championships while they were members of the CCC:

References

Indiana high school athletic conferences
High school sports conferences and leagues in the United States
2016 establishments in Indiana
Sports organizations established in 2016